Roby Consolidated Independent School District is a public school district based in Roby, Texas (USA).  Located in Fisher County, a small portion of the district extends into Jones County. The district also serves the unincorporated communities of Sylvester and McCaulley.  All students attend classes in Roby.

Roby Consolidated ISD has two campuses -

Roby High School(Grades 9-12)
Roby Elementary/Junior High (Grades PK-8).

In 2009, the school district was rated "recognized" by the Texas Education Agency.

History 
On July 1, 1990, Roby ISD absorbed the entirety of McCauley Independent School District and a portion of Hobbs Independent School District.

References

External links
Roby Consolidated ISD

School districts in Fisher County, Texas
School districts in Jones County, Texas